Ischnomyia is a genus of flies in the family Anthomyzidae. There are at least two described species in Ischnomyia.

Species
These two species belong to the genus Ischnomyia:
 Ischnomyia albicosta (Walker, 1849)
 Ischnomyia spinosa Hendel, 1911

References

Further reading

 

Anthomyzidae
Articles created by Qbugbot
Opomyzoidea genera